Double Science is a British sitcom on BBC Radio 4.  It follows Colin Jackson ("no relation") and Kenneth Farley-Pittman, two chemistry teachers existing in a work-life balance haven at the fictional Forresters Sixth Form College.  As the college specialises in drama, the science department has long languished in happy obscurity, but the recent death of the old department head and the arrival of new head Dr Alison Hatton threatens to wake the pair from their real ale fuelled  malaise.

Colin and Kenneth's lives are insular revolving around the local Indian restaurant and their weekly "film club" night. Colin is socially awkward, using out-dated slang and wears shorts and sandals all year round. Following a messy divorce from his wife, Kenneth lives on the quiet in the science block's toilets, where he also brews his own ale; he has a habit of not wearing his trousers, and some of his character traits - including the choices for the weekly film club - suggest he may be a not-so-closeted homosexual. Colin's social awkwardness and gaucheness is tested by the attraction he feels towards his new boss and competition for her attention from the right-on drama teacher Danny Woods. 
Alison is far more assertive than Colin and Kenneth, trying to drag the science department up to date, but at times can be naive and easily persuaded, herself suffering from some social awkwardness. Danny, whilst fairly successful in his role in the drama department and fancying himself as a ladies' man, is over-confident and his own brashness often leads to his own downfall, particularly regarding Alison.

Willbond and Edwards developed their characters from earlier, sketchier incarnations of the pair they had performed, partly improvised, at various comedy festivals. The curry night element which plays a part in each episode, was also developed from another previous sketch Edwards had performed in, about a group of businessmen who were obsessed with going for a curry and "the hotter the better", again at various comedy gigs.

The planned second series was put on hold when a television version for BBC Two was considered. The script for a revised version of the original radio pilot was written, with some differences and alterations, for the pilot of the proposed television version, but the series was never commissioned; the planned second series of the radio version never emerged.

Beertongue
Colin and Kenneth spend much of their time brewing beer and drinking their home-brew. At one point they visit a beer festival, where a fictional language called "Beertongue" is spoken - a mixture of Old English and Latin, with some Klingon and Elvish.

Episode guide 

The first episode was originally broadcast as a one-off pilot on Radio 4 on 4 July 2007; it was subsequently repeated on 14 May 2008, as the start of the first full series.

References

External links

Double Science
BBC Radio 4 programmes
2008 radio programme debuts
2008 radio programme endings